Other People's Children may refer to:

Other People's Children (TV series), a 2000 British television drama
"Other People's Children" (General Hospital: Night Shift), a 2008 episode of the US TV series General Hospital: Night Shift
"Other People's Children" (Modern Family), a 2014 episode from the TV series Modern Family
Other People's Children (1958 film), a 1958 Georgian film
Other People's Children (2015 film), a 2015 American film
Other People's Children (2022 film), a 2022 French film by Rebecca Zlotowski
"Honour & Other People's Children", two novellas by Australian author Helen Garner